Sypna diversa is a species of moth in the family Erebidae. The species is found in Taiwan.

References

Moths described in 1917
Sypnini